The 1963 Wittenberg Tigers football team was an American football team that represented Wittenberg University in the Ohio Athletic Conference (OAC) during the 1963 NCAA College Division football season. In their ninth year under head coach Bill Edwards, the Tigers compiled an 8–0–1 record and won the OAC championship. They were ranked No. 3 in the final Associated Press small college poll with 38 points – trailing Northern Illinois (63 points) and Delaware (53 points). Wittenberg had three consecutive undefeated seasons from 1962 to 1964.

Five Wittenberg players were selected by the Associated Press as first-team players on the 1963 All-OAC football team: quarterback Charlie Green; halfback Larry Skeldon; end Bob Cherry; defensive end Jim Worden; and linebacker Dan Mussulin.

Schedule

References

Wittenberg
Wittenberg Tigers football seasons
Wittenberg Tigers football
College football undefeated seasons